Mauno Ilmari Mäkelä (7 March 1916 – 17 October 1987) was a Finnish film producer. He also appeared as an actor in films Iskelmäketju (1959) and Luottamus (1976). 

Mäkelä received a Jussi Award for producing the film Elokuu (1956).

Selected filmography as producer 

Ratavartijan kaunis Inkeri (1950) 
Noita palaa elämään (1952)
Lumikki ja 7 jätkää (1953)
Ryysyrannan Jooseppi (1955)
Poika eli kesäänsä (1955)
Kuriton sukupolvi (1957) 
Punainen viiva (1959)
Kultainen vasikka (1961)
Kaasua, komisario Palmu! (1961)

References

External links

1916 births
1987 deaths
Businesspeople from Helsinki
People from Uusimaa Province (Grand Duchy of Finland)
Finnish film producers